U with grave (У̀ у̀; italics: У̀ у̀) is a letter of the Cyrillic script.

Usage
 is mainly used in South Slavic languages, mostly commonly in Bulgarian and it is used to differentiate homophones.

These are what they call this accent "indefinite" because it can be on any syllable and is not linked to given syllables, and it does not depend on the number of the syllables regardless – the accent can be on any of those: темен̀уга, пристан̀уша.

Computing codes
Being a relatively recent letter, not present in any legacy 8-bit Cyrillic encoding, the letter У̀ is not represented directly by a precomposed character in Unicode either; it has to be composed as У+◌̀ (U+0300).

Related letters and other similar characters
U u : Latin letter U
Ù ù : Latin letter U with grave – a Kashubian letter
Y y : Latin letter Y
У у : Cyrillic letter U
У́ у : Cyrillic letter U with acute
Ў ў : Cyrillic letter Short U
Ӱ ӱ : Cyrillic letter U with diaeresis
Ӳ ӳ : Cyrillic letter U with double acute
Ү ү : Cyrillic letter straight U
Ү́ ү́ : Cyrillic letter straight U with acute
Ұ ұ : Cyrillic letter Straight U with stroke
Cyrillic characters in Unicode

References

Letters with grave
Cyrillic letters with diacritics